Taft is a river of Hesse and Thuringia, Germany. It flows into the Ulster near Buttlar.

See also
List of rivers of Hesse
List of rivers of Thuringia

References

Rivers of Hesse
Rivers of Thuringia
Rivers of Germany